Meetings between the rugby union teams of Argentina and British & Irish Lions are not held in regular intervals. The British team went to Argentina three times in the early twentieth century, in 1910, 1927 and 1936. The next time those two teams met was nearly seventy years later in a single match played in Cardiff in May 2005. From a total of seven games, there was one draw and the rest was won by the Lions.

Summary
Note: Summary below reflects test results by both teams.

Overall

Records 
Note: Date shown in brackets indicates when the record was last set.

Results
 

 
Argentina national rugby union team matches
British & Irish Lions matches